Lee Ji-hyun (born December 12, 1986), better known by her stage name Qri, is a South Korean singer and actress. She debuted as a member of girl group T-ara in July 2009, 
who went on to become one of the best-selling girl groups of all time.Since 2009, Qri has been active in the entertainment industry from acting and Variety shows to music to modeling. Her most notable works include her supporting role in hit drama Queen Seondeok, the show received near-universal acclaim, winning over 20 awards solidifing Qri's career in the field.

Qri showed high interest in fashion design in 2018 and ended up designing several commercial products. Qri launched her self-produced jewelrybrand "Qriel" in 2021.

Early life and education

Lee Ji-hyun was born on December 12, 1986. She has studied at Juyeob High School, and then attended Myungji University, enrolling in the Department of Theatre and Visual Arts, the same class as fellow group member, Boram. She was a model, bassist of the rock band Six Color, and a famous ulzzang before her debut as a T-ara member.

Music career

T-ara

Qri was the last of the three new members to be added to the group after two former members Jiae and Jiwon quit in mid-2009. It was later mentioned on tvN's Taxi that she was introduced to the CEO of Core Contents Media by her original company.

In July 2013, Qri became the new leader of T-ara under the group's rotating leadership system.

QBS

Qri, Boram and Soyeon formed a subgroup called QBS in May 2013, focused on the Japanese market. The subgroup released their debut single titled "Kaze no You ni" (Like the Wind) on June 26, 2013.

Solo career 
In 2021, Qri released her very first solo digital single "Suri Suri". Qri was revealed to have participated in the writing and production of the song. There wasn't a music video filmed for the song.

On September 29, Qri expressed her gratitude to her fans for the song's success through Instagram. The song topped iTunes Vietnam for 3 days as well as charting in other countries. The song also debuted at #1 on multiple Chinese weekly charts including Migu China.

Acting career
In September 2009, Qri made her acting debut in the drama Queen Seondeok as Kim Yu-shin's wife. She made a cameo appearance alongside other members of T-ara in the drama Master of Study in 2010, and was then given a lead role on KBS's drama Southern Trader Kim Chul Soo's Update. Qri also made a cameo appearance alongside group member Soyeon in SBS' drama Giant.

She was cast alongside groupmate Eunjung for KBS' drama King Geunchogo in 2011, starting from episode 47.

Other ventures

Endorsements 
Prior to her debut as a singer with T-ara, Qri was a famous Ullzzang who worked with several brands and shopping malls.

Being one of the most in-demand models since 2009, Qri worked with many renowned Korean brands including Casamia Furniture and Galbanara. She also became the face of multiple A-List brands including LG Group and Maybelline New York.

In 2021, Qri became an advertising model for Castellbajac, she filmed multiple videos for the brand which were all released online.

Fashion design 
In 2018, Qri announced the launch of her first self-designed product collection with "Celebrity hat brand" Sebs named "Seb.Q" . The collection featured colored hats and hoodies. It was announced that Qri participated in both the designing and production of the products. The project was a huge success with all products selling out and constantly being restocked since 2018.

In 2021, Qri established her own jewelry brand named "Qriel" for which she modeled herself.

Discography

Filmography

Film

Television series

Web series

Variety shows

Music Videos

Accolades

Awards & nominations

Listicles

References

External links

1986 births
K-pop singers
T-ara members
South Korean women pop singers
South Korean female idols
Living people
Myongji University alumni
MBK Entertainment artists
South Korean television actresses
People from Goyang